Rita (Marathi: रीटा) is a Marathi language film directed by Renuka Shahane starring Pallavi Joshi, Jakie Shroff, Renuka Shahane, Dr. Mohan Agashe, Tushar Dalvi, Suhasini Mule, Sai Tamhankar, Makarand Deshpande, Medha Jambotkar, Tucha Vaidya, Rajashree Nikam.
The film was released on 4 September 2009. It is based on the book, Rita Welingkar, written by Shahane's mother, Shanta Gokhale.

Cast
 Pallavi Joshi as Rita
 Jackie Shroff  as Mr. Salvi
 Renuka Shahane as Saraswati 
 Mohan Agashe as Shanks 
 Tushar Dalvi as Sundaram 
  Makrand Deshpande as Eric 
 Gargi as Young Sherry 
 Medha Jambotkar as Susheela 
 Sai Tamhankar as Sangeeta 
 Rucha Vaidya as Young Rita 
 Pushkar Shrotri

References

External links
 

 
 

2009 films
2000s Marathi-language films